Enchanted April is a 1935 American comedy drama film directed by Harry Beaumont and starring Ann Harding, Frank Morgan and Katharine Alexander. It was made by RKO Pictures. The original 1922 novel The Enchanted April has also been adapted for the stage multiple times, and adapted for the 1991 film by screenwriter Peter Barnes.

Plot
At Hampstead Court Housewives Club, two women sit in the living room with a fireplace. Outside it's raining. One of the women reads a book (a biography of Madame Du Barry); the other woman is nervously looking around the room and finally decides to look up the newspaper. When she sees a certain announcement, she has to talk, saying to the other woman how beautiful it would be to leave dreadful London and go south to Italy, renting a Castle for two or more people and splitting the costs. So they find the way to San Salvatore, and the Enchanted April is there from the very minute they arrive.

Their husbands and lovers are soon popping up and passing by, and the Italians who know, understand the English people. A mixture of slapstick comedy and on the other side the rarefied figure of Ann Harding.

Setting
San Salvatore is based on Castello Brown, overlooking Portofino, where Elizabeth von Arnim had stayed. The film was not shot on location, but Jane Baxter did visit later "to see what the house was really like".

Cast 
 Ann Harding as Lottie Wilkins
 Katharine Alexander  as Rose Arbuthnot
 Frank Morgan as Mr. Wilkins
 Reginald Owen as  Mr. Arbuthnot
 Jane Baxter as Lady Caroline Dester
 Ralph Forbes as Mr. Briggs
 Jessie Ralph as Mrs. Fisher
 Charles Judels as Domenico
 Rafaela Ottiano as Francesca

Home video

As of 2017, Enchanted April has only seen one authorised home video release: a 2005 region 2 French DVD on the Éditions Montparnasse label, titled Avril enchanté. It features a very clean print from an unconverted NTSC-PAL master, hence its unaltered 66 minute running time, and optional French subtitles in a small yellow font. Additionally, there is an informative 2 minute intro – in French, without subtitles – by film historian and restorer Serge Bromberg of Lobster Films. There is also a lesser-quality counterfeit 2013 Spanish DVD, titled Un Abril Encantado.

References

External links

Enchanted April at TCMDB
Enchanted April TCMDB article
Enchanted April 1935 The New York Times review

1935 films
1930s romantic comedy-drama films
Films set in London
Films set in Liguria
American black-and-white films
RKO Pictures films
Films based on British novels
American romantic comedy-drama films
1935 comedy films
1935 drama films
1930s English-language films
1930s American films